HMS Owen was a  frigate built for the Royal Navy during World War 2.

Design and description
Owen was converted into a survey vessel while still under construction. She was powered by two vertical triple-expansion steam engines, each driving one shaft, using steam provided by two Admiralty three-drum boilers. The ship's complement was 133 officers and ratings.

The survey ships were armed only with four 3-pounder saluting guns.

Construction and career
She was named for the explorer and naval officer William Fitzwilliam Owen. She was originally laid down as the  vessel Loch Muick, and re-ordered as Thurso Bay while building. She was completed as Owen, modified for use as a survey vessel for dealing with the large numbers of uncharted wrecks and mines around the British Isles as a result of World War II. For this purpose she was fitted for minesweeping.

References

Bibliography
 
 
 
 

 

Bay-class frigates
1945 ships